Thomas Coningsby II (died 1616), of Hampton Wafer, Herefordshire was an English politician.

He was the 3rd son of Thomas Coningsby I of Leominster, Herefordshire.

He was a Clerk of the Petty Bag from 1607 to 1609.

He was a Member (MP) of the Parliament of England for Leominster 1601, 1604 and 1614.

References

16th-century births
1616 deaths
Date of death unknown
English MPs 1601
English MPs 1604–1611
English MPs 1614
Place of birth unknown
Place of death unknown
Year of birth unknown